Pleurostachys is a genus of flowering plants belonging to the family Cyperaceae.

Its native range is Trinidad to Southern Tropical America.

Species:

Pleurostachys angustifolia 
Pleurostachys arcuata 
Pleurostachys beyrichii 
Pleurostachys bracteolata 
Pleurostachys bradei 
Pleurostachys calyptrocaryoides 
Pleurostachys densifoliata 
Pleurostachys distichophylla 
Pleurostachys douglasii 
Pleurostachys foliosa 
Pleurostachys gaudichaudii 
Pleurostachys geraldiana 
Pleurostachys guianensis 
Pleurostachys hoehneana 
Pleurostachys kuhlmannii 
Pleurostachys loefgrenii 
Pleurostachys martiana 
Pleurostachys millegrana 
Pleurostachys muelleri 
Pleurostachys orbignyana 
Pleurostachys pearcei 
Pleurostachys peruviana 
Pleurostachys pilulifera 
Pleurostachys puberula 
Pleurostachys regnellii 
Pleurostachys scaposa 
Pleurostachys sellowii 
Pleurostachys sparsiflora 
Pleurostachys stricta 
Pleurostachys tenuiflora 
Pleurostachys turbinata 
Pleurostachys ulei 
Pleurostachys undulatifolia 
Pleurostachys urvillei

References

Cyperaceae
Cyperaceae genera